The Autumn Cup was an ice hockey competition in the United Kingdom between 1946 and 2000. The competition was originally divided into English and Scottish competitions, known as the English Autumn Cup and the Scottish Autumn Cup between 1946 and 1954 when it became the British Autumn Cup until 1960. The competition did not take place again until 1967 when it was resurrected as the Northern Autumn Cup before it again became a national competition in 1983. Following a series of major sponsorships during the 1980s it became known as simply the Autumn Cup in 1991 before a sponsorship deal with Benson & Hedges renamed it the Benson & Hedges Cup (B&H Cup) in 1982 until their association ended in 2001 and the Autumn Cup discontinued.

The competition was contested during the opening months of each season with preliminary round games taking up the majority of the early season schedule. From 1983 finals were played at a predetermined venue with Sheffield Arena becoming the sole venue in 1991. Between 1983 and 2000, all but three finals were settled in regulation time with the 1983, 1986 and 1999 finals going into overtime and the 1983 and 1999 final being settled on penalty shots.

Winners

English Autumn Cup

Scottish Autumn Cup

British Autumn Cup

Northern Autumn Cup

Kohler Engines Autumn Cup

Bluecol Autumn Cup

Norwich Union Trophy

Autumn Cup

Benson & Hedges Cup

Clubs by number of Autumn Cup titles

References

A to Z Encyclopedia of Ice Hockey

Ice hockey competitions in the United Kingdom
Ice hockey competitions in Scotland
Ice hockey competitions in England